Akira Inoue may refer to:

, Japanese film director
, Japanese keyboardist, composer and producer